Northgate is an unorganized hamlet in southeastern Saskatchewan, Canada, within the rural municipality of Enniskillen No. 3.  This hamlet is located along the Canada–United States border across from the community of Northgate, North Dakota.

Almost all of the remaining town was razed in 2013/2014 to make room for an extension of the Canadian National Railway.

References

Enniskillen No. 3, Saskatchewan
Unincorporated communities in Saskatchewan
Division No. 1, Saskatchewan